The Lodge is a historic apartment building located at Indianapolis, Indiana.  It was built in 1905, and is a three-story, three bay, rectangular, Georgian Revival style red brick building.  It features a limestone entrance portico with Ionic order columns and three-story bay windows.

It was listed on the National Register of Historic Places in 1983.

References

External links

Apartment buildings in Indiana
Residential buildings on the National Register of Historic Places in Indiana
Residential buildings completed in 1905
Georgian Revival architecture in Indiana
Residential buildings in Indianapolis
National Register of Historic Places in Indianapolis
1905 establishments in Indiana